Noor Amer Al-Ameri (born 12 January 1994) is an Iraqi competitive shooter. At the 2012 Summer Olympics, she competed in the Women's 10 metre air pistol.

References

Iraqi female sport shooters
Living people
Olympic shooters of Iraq
Shooters at the 2012 Summer Olympics
1994 births